J. R. Smith (born 1985) is an American professional basketball player.

J. R. Smith may also refer to:
Jay R. Smith (1915–2002), American actor
John Raphael Smith (1751–1812), British engraver
John Rubens Smith (1775–1849), British artist and engraver
John Rowson Smith (1810–1864), American panoramic painter